Sir Christopher Eden Steel  (12 February 1903 – 17 September 1973) was a British diplomat who was permanent representative to NATO and ambassador to West Germany.

Career
Christopher Steel was educated at Wellington College and Hertford College, Oxford (he held scholarships at both) and entered the Diplomatic Service in 1927. He served at Rio de Janeiro, Paris, The Hague, Berlin and Cairo. For a year in 1935–36 he was assistant private secretary to the Prince of Wales. He was British political officer at SHAEF 1945–47, political adviser to the British Commander-in-Chief, Germany, 1947–49 and deputy British High Commissioner, Germany, 1949–50. He was Minister (deputy head of mission) at the British Embassy, Washington, D.C., 1950–53, UK Permanent Representative on the North Atlantic Council 1953–57 and Ambassador to West Germany 1957–63. He retired from the Diplomatic Service in 1963 and was chairman of the Anglo-German Association 1966–73.

He was held in high admiration by many foreigners and particularly by the Germans, among whom he spent a major part of his career, for the accuracy with which he corresponded to the conventional image of an Englishman: his tall military figure, his ruddy complexion and neat moustache, his skill as a shot, fisherman and golfer, and his straightforward and occasionally outspoken manner. He also inspired deep affection among those who knew the warmth of hs friendship, his charm as a host and his kindly but firm leadership as a Head of Mission.— Sir Denis Greenhill

Honours
He was knighted KCMG in the King's Birthday Honours of 1951 and promoted to GCMG in the 1960 New Year Honours.

Offices held

References
STEEL, Sir Christopher Eden, Who Was Who, A & C Black, 1920–2015 (online edition, Oxford University Press, 2014)
Sir Christopher Steel: Former Ambassador to Bonn, The Times, London, 18 September 1973, page 21

External links

1903 births
1973 deaths
People educated at Wellington College, Berkshire
Alumni of Hertford College, Oxford
Permanent Representatives of the United Kingdom to NATO
Ambassadors of the United Kingdom to West Germany
Knights Grand Cross of the Order of St Michael and St George
Members of the Royal Victorian Order
Grand Crosses with Star and Sash of the Order of Merit of the Federal Republic of Germany